Listed here are software packages useful for conducting scientific research in astronomy, and for seeing, exploring, and learning about the data used in astronomy.

Lists of software